Verbandsgemeinde Landstuhl is a Verbandsgemeinde ("collective municipality") in the district of Kaiserslautern, in Rhineland-Palatinate, western Germany. The seat is in the town of Landstuhl.

History
 1971 - On 1 September 1971 Verbandsgemeinde Landstuhl was established with the following municipalities:
 Bann, Hauptstuhl, Kindsbach, Landstuhl, Mittelbrunn, and Oberarnbach
 2019 - On 1 July 2019 Verbandsgemeinde Kaiserslautern-Süd was merged into it and the following six municipalities were added:
 Krickenbach, Linden, Queidersbach , Schopp , Stelzenberg and Trippstadt

References

External links

 
  

Landstuhl
Landstuhl
Landstuhl
Landstuhl